Driulis González Morales (born September 21, 1973 in Guantánamo) is a Cuban judoka who has won four Olympic medals, including a gold medal in 1996. She carried the flag for her native country at the opening ceremony of the 2007 Pan American Games in Rio de Janeiro, Brazil.

Along with Australia's Mária Pekli and Japan's Ryoko Tamura-Tani, Driulis is the first female judoka to compete at five Olympics. The only other judokas to compete at five Olympics are Belgian Robert Van de Walle and Puerto Rican judoka-bobsledder Jorge Bonnet.

References

External links
 
 
 

1973 births
Living people
Judoka at the 1992 Summer Olympics
Judoka at the 1996 Summer Olympics
Judoka at the 2000 Summer Olympics
Judoka at the 2004 Summer Olympics
Judoka at the 2008 Summer Olympics
Judoka at the 1995 Pan American Games
Judoka at the 2003 Pan American Games
Judoka at the 2007 Pan American Games
Olympic judoka of Cuba
Olympic gold medalists for Cuba
Olympic silver medalists for Cuba
Olympic bronze medalists for Cuba
Sportspeople from Guantánamo
Olympic medalists in judo
Medalists at the 2004 Summer Olympics
Cuban female judoka
Medalists at the 2000 Summer Olympics
Medalists at the 1996 Summer Olympics
Medalists at the 1992 Summer Olympics
Pan American Games gold medalists for Cuba
Pan American Games medalists in judo
Universiade medalists in judo
Central American and Caribbean Games gold medalists for Cuba
Competitors at the 2006 Central American and Caribbean Games
Universiade gold medalists for Cuba
Central American and Caribbean Games medalists in judo
Medalists at the 1999 Summer Universiade
Medalists at the 1995 Pan American Games
20th-century Cuban people
21st-century Cuban people